Vambery or Vámbéry may refer to:

 Ármin Vámbéry - Arminius Vambery (1832–1913), Hungarian traveller, philologist
 Rusztem Vámbéry - Rustem Vambery (1872–1948), Hungarian jurist, politician.